Richard Fleetwood (1653–1709), of Rossall Hall, Lancashire, was an English politician.

He was a Member (MP) of the Parliament of England for Lancashire from 18 April 1704 to 1705.

References

1653 births
1709 deaths
Members of the Parliament of England (pre-1707) for Lancashire
English MPs 1702–1705